The Linfen Ring Expressway, designated as S2202 (formerly G0501 before 2019) is an expressway in Southern Central China going around the city of Linfen.  This expressway is a branch of G5 Jingkun Expressway.

Route

References

Expressways in Shanxi
Linfen